Faraneh Vargha-Khadem (born 1949) is a British cognitive neuroscientist specializing in developmental amnesia among children. Faraneh was a part of the team that identified the FOXP2 gene, the so-called 'speech gene', that may explain why humans talk and chimps do not.

Education
Vargha-Khadem was educated at McGill University and the University of Massachusetts.

Career and research
She served as head of the clinical neuropsychology service at Great Ormond Street Hospital, and director of the centre for developmental cognitive neuroscience at University College London. Faraneh was the awarded the BPS Barbara Wilson Lifetime Achievement Award in 2013.

References

Living people
1949 births
British cognitive neuroscientists
Academics of University College London
National Health Service people